Rolf Martin Landerl (born 24 October 1975) is an Austrian professional football coach and a former player. He is the manager of Admira Wacker.

Coaching career
Landerl worked from 2010 to 2011 as a youth coach for VfB Lübeck while he still played for the club. In 2011, Landerl joined SV St. Margarethen as a player and he was also hired as an individual coach at the academy of his former club, Admira Wacker. In November 2012, he was appointed player-manager for St. Margarethen. He left St. Margarethen in the summer 2013.

On 4 July 2013, Landerl was appointed manager of FC Admira Wacker Mödling Amateure. In January 2016 VfB Lübeck confirmed, that Landerl would return to the club for the 2016–17 season as the club's new manager.

On 4 June 2021 he returned to Austria and was hired by Horn.

Career statistics

References

External links

Profile at laola1.at 

1975 births
Living people
Austrian footballers
Austria international footballers
Association football forwards
SK Rapid Wien players
FK Inter Bratislava players
AZ Alkmaar players
Fortuna Sittard players
FC Groningen players
F.C. Penafiel players
FC Sopron players
FC Admira Wacker Mödling players
Grazer AK players
VfB Lübeck players
Eredivisie players
FC DAC 1904 Dunajská Streda players
Slovak Super Liga players
Footballers from Vienna
Austrian expatriate sportspeople in Germany
Austrian expatriate sportspeople in Portugal
Austrian expatriate sportspeople in Slovakia
Austrian expatriate sportspeople in the Netherlands
Expatriate football managers in Germany
Expatriate footballers in Portugal
Expatriate footballers in Slovakia
Expatriate footballers in the Netherlands
Austrian football managers
VfB Lübeck managers
ASK Schwadorf players
SV Horn managers
FC Admira Wacker Mödling managers